Brseč  is a village in western Croatia. It is part of Mošćenička Draga municipality in Primorje-Gorski Kotar County.

It is connected to Rijeka and Pula by the D66 highway.

Notable people
Eugen Kumičić (1850–1904), writer.

Monuments and sights

Art installation "Strokes and Incisions" 

"Strokes and Incisions", a site-specific art installation authored by Danish-Austrian artist Sofie Thorsen can be found in the small park next to the bocce court at the very entrance to Brseč. Thorsen was inspired by a primary school in Brseč closing after more than one hundred and seventy-five years of continuous work. The installation consists of three stone objects whose shapes and colors symbolize paper, and the incised lines represent a fountain pen. The engraved forms were created on the basis of three pre-existing inscriptions: scribbles from old student notebooks from the closed school, graffiti from a street in Brseč and fragments of manuscripts by Eugen Kumičić.

As part of the project, the aforementioned Brseč bocce court was renovated.

References 

Populated places in Primorje-Gorski Kotar County